Su Sanniang (蘇三娘; 1830–1854), was a Chinese rebel during the Taiping Rebellion. The leader of a band of outlaws, she joined the rebellion with a band of 2000 soldiers. She was said to have powerful arms and could wield two swords with ease. Her contemporaries gave the following description of her: “well built with an elegant face and a fine figure. She had the air of a hero”.

Biography 
Su Sanniang was born around the 1830s in the south Guandong Province, where the Hakka are the majority. Unlike the northern Han, where the farm work was masculine and the women only took care of the housework, the Hakka women also collaborated in the collection of tea, in the cultivation of rice and plowed with water buffaloes, they didn't followed the Confucian codes as strictly and their feet were not bound. According to The Biographical Dictionary of Chinese Women, Su Sanniang learned martial arts and swordplay from her family. She was said to have powerful arms and “the air of a hero”.

She married Su San, a man from a respectable family who went bankrupt due to a powerful member of the local gentry. She and her husband first joined a secret society called the Tiandihui. They then established in 1849 the Guangyitang dedicated to “killing the officials and protecting the people” and prohibiting “unauthorized disturbances”. On their banner was written: “Rob the rich to help the poor and return to your native place to carry out revenge”.

While her husband was an excellent strategist, Su Sanniang excelled in the martial arts. Su Sanniang moved with her husband to Guangxi, where he was killed by the Qing militia. Su Sanniang, clad in mourning clothes, dedicated herself to avenging him. With several hundred young men under her command, she searched for his murderers and ultimately accomplished her goal.  The authorities barely paid attention due to him being a simple peasant, so she swore revenge. She managed to gather a hundred young people and toured the region with them until she found and killed the bandits. Persecuted by the authorities, Su Sanniang and her gang dedicated themselves to rob the rich to divide their wealth among the poor. This earned Su the sympathy of the people and more volunteers joined their group.

Su Sanniang and the two thousand men under her command joined the Taiping Rebellion, a devastating civil war, convinced by their goal of establishing a “peaceful world for all”. It lasted from 1850 to 1864 and at one point involved over one million soldiers, both men and women. The Rebellion was known for advocating equal rights for women, but also for mandating separation between women and men. When the men's and women's forces were divided, Su Sanniang became the leader of the female battalions, alongside Hong Xuanjiao, the sister of the leader of the rebellion (Hong Xiuquan), Qiu Ersao, who was one of the commanders of Red Turban Rebels, and other women whose names have been lost to history

The Taiping Army occupied Nanjing in March 1853. They soon marched on Zhenjiang. The female battalions under Su Sanniang’s command were the first to conquer the city. She then led her army to attack Yangzhou and her appearance greatly impressed people. The Qing army attacked Zhenjiang shortly after. The female battalions were the city’s main defense force and Su Sanniang greatly contributed to the battle. The last historical record about her places her in the Siege of Zhenjiang City in 1854. It is unknown if she died there or survived.

Legacy 
A poem about her says:

Drums and bugles sound clearly atop the city walls

Soldiers stand at attention, their flags and banners unfurled.

Passersby push and shove each other,

As they rush to catch a glimpse of Su Sanniang. 

The daughter from Ling Mountain is extremely skilled.

Ten years with the bandits, she’s called a valiant woman.

Dressed in crimson before an audience, she receives an official rank

Dressed in white mourning clothes for her husband, she beheads her foes.

Her arms have fought more than one hundred battles.

She doesn’t lower her spear until she has killed a thousand. 

The Qing general, hearing of her fame, summons his forces for war. 

Galloping on their horses, shouting loudly, their spirits running high,

Five hundred stalwart youths under her command charge the enemy soldiers,

Who flee like so many thousands of forlorn rats.

Upon his return, the Qing commander washes his knife and curses madly. 

He shamefully lies about his losses and is promoted to a high position.

Sources 

 Lily Xiao Hong Lee, Clara Lau, A.D. Stefanowska: Biographical Dictionary of Chinese Women: v. 1: The Qing Period, 1644–1911 
 Kazuko Ono: Chinese Women in a Century of Revolution, 1850–1950

References 

1830 births
1854 deaths
19th-century Chinese people
People of the Taiping Rebellion
Women in 19th-century warfare
Women in war in China
19th-century Chinese women
Military leaders of the Taiping Rebellion